Ronald Bruce Rogers  (born November 5, 1952), better known as Ron Rogers or Ronnie Rogers, is a songwriter, composer, recording artist and record producer from New York City. His career spanned from the late 1970s until the 1990s.

Life and career
Rogers was born in Soundview, South Bronx, New York in 1952.

After recording a debut RCA Victor LP entitled Gichy Dan’s Beachwood # 9, co-produced with songwriter August Darnell, Rogers composed the words and music to Don Armando's hit "Deputy of Love", which reached number one on the Billboard U.S. dance chart. Following this initial success, Michael Zilkha, founder of ZE Records, began publishing Rogers' compositions through Island Records. The compositions were recorded on 24-track analog recording decks by New York session musicians, including Rogers multitracking on piano, drums and vocals. Among the disco-inspired recordings were: "Spooks In Space" by The Aural Exciters, written by Rogers; Gichy Dan's "Cowboys and Gangsters", written and produced by Rogers; and Rogers' own solo EP "Don't Play With My Emotions", all released on ZE Records / Arista Records / Island Records.

Rogers went on to compose, produce and perform on recordings including "The Lifeboat Party", lead track of the Kid Creole and the Coconuts album Doppelganger; "Gina Gina", from Kid Creole's Fresh Fruit in Foreign Places LP; "City Nights/ Manhattan Cafe's" and "In The Middle Of The Night", released on Rogers' own Blue Chip record label, featuring vocalist Cory Daye of Dr. Buzzard's Original Savannah Band; and Elbow Bones and the Racketeers' UK Top 40 hit "A Night In New York", co-written with lyricist D. Clarkin and released on  EMI. In total Rogers has writing or production credits on over 30 recordings.

Selected discography

*   (#)X  = denotes re-issues/remixes+number of releases

References

External links

 Ron Rogers SONGS .COM
 Ron Rogers Discography
 Listen To: “The Lifeboat Party” 

1952 births
Living people
People from the Bronx
Musicians from New York City
Record producers from New York (state)
ZE Records artists